The Pelican Nebula (also known as IC 5070 and IC 5067) is an H II region associated with the North America Nebula in the constellation Cygnus. The gaseous contortions of this emission nebula bear a resemblance to a pelican, giving rise to its name. The Pelican Nebula is located nearby first magnitude star Deneb, and is divided from its more prominent neighbour, the North America Nebula, by a foreground molecular cloud filled with dark dust. Both are part of the larger H II region of Westerhout 40.

The Pelican is much studied because it has a particularly active mix of star formation and evolving gas clouds. The light from young energetic stars is slowly transforming cold gas to hot and causing an ionization front gradually to advance outward. Particularly dense filaments of cold gas are seen to still remain, and among these are found two jets emitted from the Herbig–Haro object 555. Millions of years from now this nebula might no longer be known as the Pelican, as the balance and placement of stars and gas will leave something that appears completely different.

References

External links

APOD Pictures:
 Pelican Nebula Close-up
 North America and the Pelican
 Nebulae in the Northern Cross
 IC 5067 in the Pelican Nebula
 Northern Cygnus
 Atlas of the Universe
 Image by Arran Hill
 IC 5067/5070 Hires LRGB CCD Image

Cygnus (constellation)
H II regions
IC objects
Star-forming regions